Fahmi (Arabic: فهمي) is an Arabic name in the possessive form of the word fahm (Arabic: فَهْم) which means "understanding, comprehension, knowing", and which stems from the verb fahima (Arabic: َفَهِم) meaning "come to know about", "to realize, understand or comprehend". It may refer to:

Given name
Fahmi Abdullah Ahmed, Yemeni captured and detained in the United States Guantanamo Bay detainment camps in Cuba
Fahmi al-Abboushi (1895–1975), co-founder of the Palestinian political party Hizb al-Istiqlal (Independence Party)
Fahmi al-Husseini (1886–1940), mayor of Gaza (1929–1939) under British rule
Fahmi Idris (born 1943), Indonesian politician in Golkar Party and government minister
Fahmi Reza (born 1977), Malaysian political artist
Mohammad Fahmi bin Abdul Shukor, a convicted rioter and gang member of Salakau in Singapore
Mustafa Fahmi Pasha (1840–1914), Egyptian politician, cabinet minister, and twice premier
Fahmi Khalil Al Ansari (1940-2021), Palestinian intellectual, teacher and founder of The Bayt al-Maqdas: The Fahmi Al-Ansari Library in East Jerusalem.

Surname
Abdelilah Fahmi (born 1973), Moroccan football defender who plays for Raja Casablanca
Heshmat Fahmi, member of the Pan-African Parliament and a member of the People's Assembly of Egypt
Ismail Fahmi (1922–1997), Egyptian diplomat and politician
Nabil Fahmi (born 1951), Egyptian diplomat and politician, and Ismail Fahmi's son
Sameh Fahmi (born 1949), Egyptian politician

Variants:
 Mohamed Fahmy, Canadian journalist

Arabic-language surnames
Arabic masculine given names